R. J. Mattes (born April 29, 1990) is an American football offensive lineman that played for the New England Patriots and Tampa Bay Bucs. He played college football at North Carolina State. He also saw time with the Boston brawlers with the fxfl.

Professional career

New England Patriots
On May 13, 2013, Mattes signed with the New England Patriots as an undrafted free agent. On May 23, he was released by the Patriots. On June 3, 2013, he was re-signed by the team. On August 19, 2013, he was released by the Patriots for the second time. On August 20, 2013, he cleared waivers and was placed on the Patriots' injured reserve list. On August 24, 2013, he was waived from injured reserve with an injury settlement. Mattes was signed by the New England Patriots as a free agent on December 30, 2013 
He was waived on June 11, 2014.

Tampa Bay Buccaneers
Mattes signed with the Tampa Bay Buccaneers on August 21, 2014. The Buccaneers waived Mattes on August 24.

References

External links
North Carolina State bio 
New England Patriots bio

Living people
New England Patriots players
NC State Wolfpack football players
Boston Brawlers players
1990 births
Players of American football from Washington (state)